The Putnam Standard was an independent, weekly newspaper covering Putnam County, West Virginia. The paper was first printed in 1877 in Winfield, West Virginia by J.G. Downtain. Until 2006, the paper was published as "The Putnam Democrat."

The paper published its last issue on April 2, 2015 after going out of business Before that, the paper was published every Thursday by Stadelman Publishing, which purchased the paper in 2013.

External links
 The Putnam Standard Website
 The Putnam Standard on Facebook

References

Newspapers published in West Virginia
Cabell County, West Virginia
Weekly newspapers published in the United States
Publications established in 1877
1877 establishments in West Virginia